Kolanji is a 2019 Indian Tamil-language comedy drama film co-written and directed by Dhanaram Saravanan, produced by Naveen, and starring Kirubakaran, Samuthirakani, Sanghavi (in her comeback film after taking a 11-year hiatus from the industry itself), Rajaj, and Naina Sarwar. The film features cinematography by Vijayan Munusamy, editing by Athiyappan Siva, and music composed by Natarajan Sankaran. The film released on 26 July 2019.

Plot
The film opens with a playful Kolanji (Kirubakaran) getting a few whacks from his father Appasamy (Samuthirakani), who is an atheist. Kolanji's playfulness and unruly behaviour lands him in trouble at all times with his father, who keeps scolding and beating him. This forms a hatred for his father in Kolanji, but he seems to be happy when he is with his uncle Gemini (Rajaj), and he helps him in his love for his cousin sister Poongoodi (Naina Sarwar).  The story revolves around Kolanji and his feelings towards his father, and takes a drastic turn after an incident involving his younger brother. How Kolanji realises his father's affection when he lands in trouble with a fellow villager's son forms the rest of the story.

Cast

 Kirubakaran as Kolanji
 Samuthirakani as Appasamy
 Sanghavi as Appasamy's wife
 Rajaj as Gemini
 Naina Sarwar as Poongoodi
 A. Govindamoorthy
 Nasath
 Rajin
 Rujil Krishna
 Naadodigal Gopal
 Rekha Suresh
 Aadhira

Production
In February 2015, it was reported that director Naveen, who made his debut in Moodar Koodam (2013), was working on his second film titled Kolanji for producer Nehru Nagar Nandhu, who had earlier produced the Vidharth-starrer Kaadu (2014). Actors Samuthirakani, Sanghavi, Rajaj, and Naina Sarwar were selected to portray the lead roles, with production beginning in mid-2015. Samuthirakani had agreed to work on the film after being impressed by Naveen's previous film, while Sanghavi made a comeback to acting after a 10-year sabbatical. Soon after production was completed in August 2015, Naveen clarified that he had taken over as the producer of the film and that his assistant, Dhanaram Saravanan was the director and a co-writer for the project. Naveen revealed that Kolanji was the tale of a 12-year-old boy who wants to live life on his own terms, while his father wants to raise his children in a highly disciplined manner. The film was primarily shot in rural places including Rasipuram and Kokkarayan Pettai.

The film's promotion campaign began in mid-2016, but the venture was delayed owing to the presence of several other bigger budget films at the box office. Cinematographer P. C. Sriram released the film's motion poster in June 2016, while actor Silambarasan released a teaser for the film during the same month.

Soundtrack 
The film's score and soundtrack is composed by Natarajan Sankaran. The album was released on 9 February 2017.

References

External links 

2010s Tamil-language films
Indian drama films
Films set in Tamil Nadu
Films shot in Tamil Nadu
2019 films
2019 drama films